Joseph Frederick Cotton (January 21, 1922 – May 5, 2016) was an American military test pilot.

Early life
Cotton was born in Rushville, Indiana on Jan. 21, 1922, the only son of Mr. and Mrs. Joseph A. Cotton. Cotton was a graduate of Manilla High School where he was a member of the basketball team and a 4H club member. He lived in Rush County and helped his father with work on the family farm until he reached the age of 20.

Military service
In his first combat mission, in November 1943, the plane he was co-piloting crash-landed on the island of Corfu after being hit by anti-aircraft fire. After four months the crew members were able to escape with the help of Italian allies, and Mr. Cotton was sent back to the U.S. to recover from malaria and return to flight school to become a flight instructor.

He later attended the Empire Test Pilot School, and eventually was the chief test pilot for the Air Force. He was head of the B-58 Hustler and XB-70 test programs, and was flying in the ill-fated formation flight that resulted in the loss of XB-70 A/V2 on June 8, 1966. He retired from the Air Force in 1968 having been involved in aeronautical research for 22 of his 26 years.

Awards and decorations

Other achievements

Post-military career
Cotton was hired as an engineering flight test pilot for United after his military retirement. In total, he flew more than 16,000 flight hours in 80 different military bombers, fighters, transports, and civilian aircraft.

Cotton died on May 5, 2016, survived by his wife Rema, and three children.

References

1922 births
2016 deaths
People from Rushville, Indiana
United States Army Air Forces pilots of World War II
United States Air Force officers
American test pilots
American aviators
American aviation record holders
Cultural historians
Flight speed record holders
American flight instructors